Karol Tarło (1639–1702) was voivode of the Lublin Voivodeship (voivodeship of the past Polish–Lithuanian Commonwealth, today Lublin Voivodeship but of the Third Polish Rzeczpospolita) in the years 1685–1689 as well as a Crown Chancellor of Poland in the years1639-1702.	

His father was Peter Alexander Tarło, castellan of Lublin, and his mother was Jadwiga Lanckorońska (before 1674). His son was Adam Tarło Peter (d. 1719) - stolnik royal governor and prefect of Lubelski, Janowski. He had three daughters, Jagwiga Tarło - wife of John Casimir castellan of Radom Lanckorońskiego, Teresa Magdalena and Dorota.

References

Secular senators of the Polish–Lithuanian Commonwealth
17th-century Polish nobility
Karol
1639 births
1702 deaths
Crown Vice-Chancellors